Ângelo Manuel Ferreira Varela (born 25 March 1980 in Paredes) is a Portuguese footballer who plays for Sobrado as a defensive midfielder.

References

1980 births
Living people
People from Paredes, Portugal
Portuguese footballers
Association football midfielders
Liga Portugal 2 players
Segunda Divisão players
Ermesinde S.C. players
A.D. Lousada players
FC Pampilhosa players
C.D. Estarreja players
G.D. Ribeirão players
G.D. Estoril Praia players
C.D. Fátima players
G.D. Chaves players
Rebordosa A.C. players
Sportspeople from Porto District